Estrandia is a monotypic genus of dwarf spiders containing the single species, Estrandia grandaeva. It was first described by H. H. Blauvelt in 1936, and has only been found in China, Japan, and Russia.

See also
 List of Linyphiidae species (A–H)

References

Holarctic spiders
Linyphiidae
Monotypic Araneomorphae genera